CaratLane is an Indian physical and online jewelry retailer, headquartered in Chennai, India.

History 
The company was founded by Mithun Sacheti, and Srinivasa Gopalan, in 2008. As of July 2016, the company is a subsidiary of Titan Jewellery, and marketed as a partnership with Tanishq. As of December 2021, the retailer had 130 stores across 36 cities in India.

The company started off as an online retailer before opening physical stores, with its first store opening in Chennai.

Funding

CaratLane has raised four rounds of capital, Series A through Series D, with the most recent round being led by Tiger Global, a US-based Hedge fund.

Additional notes

 On 20 August 2015, CaratLane launched an app that uses facial recognition and 3D imaging technology to allow customers virtually try on the earrings available on their site. This app can be downloaded on to any smart device.
 In 2011, Dataquest, Sapient Nitro and JuxtConsult conducted a study to identify the most popular e-commerce sites in India and CaratLane was in the top 20. It was also identified as the best in terms of usability and user interface design.

References

External links
 

Internet properties established in 2008
Online retailers of India
Companies based in Chennai
2008 establishments in Tamil Nadu
Jewellery companies of India